r/place was a collaborative project and social experiment hosted on the social networking site Reddit on April Fools' Day 2017 and repeated again on April Fools' Day 2022. 

The 2017 experiment involved an online canvas located at a subreddit called r/place. Registered users could edit the canvas by changing the color of a single pixel with a replacement from a 16-color palette. After each pixel was placed, a timer prevented the user from placing any more pixels for a period of time varying from 5 to 20 minutes. The idea of the experiment was conceived by Josh Wardle. It was ended by Reddit administrators about 72 hours after its creation, on 3 April 2017. Over 1 million users edited the canvas, placing a total of approximately 16 million pixels, and, at the time the experiment was ended, over 90,000 users were actively viewing or editing the canvas. The experiment was commended for its representation of the culture of Reddit's online communities, and of Internet culture as a whole.

On 1 April 2022, Reddit began a reboot of the experiment that lasted for four days.

Overview 
The experiment, on both occasions, was based in a subreddit called r/place, in which individual registered users could place a single colored pixel (or "tile") on an online canvas of one million (1000 x 1000) pixel squares, and wait a certain amount of time before placing another. In 2017, the waiting time varied from 5 to 20 minutes throughout the experiment, and the user could choose their pixel's color from a palette of sixteen colors. In the 2022 edition, the canvas was eventually expanded to four million (2000 x 2000) pixel squares, and the palette gradually gained sixteen more colors for a total of 32.

2017 experiment 

The early hours of the experiment were characterized by random pixel placement and chaotic attempts at image creation. Among the first distinct sections of the canvas to emerge was a corner of entirely blue pixels (named "Blue Corner") and an homage to Pokémon. As the canvas developed, some established subreddit communities, such as those for video games, sports teams and individual countries, coordinated user efforts to claim and decorate particular sections. This frequently caused conflict between communities competing for space on the canvas. Overall, thousands of subreddit communities were involved.

Other sections of the canvas were developed by communities and coordination efforts created specifically for the event. Several works of pixel art sprouted from the collaboration of these communities, varying from fictional characters and internet memes to patriotic flags, LGBT flags, and recreations of famous pieces of artwork such as the Mona Lisa and The Starry Night. Several self-declared "cults" also formed to create and maintain various emblematic features such as the (black) void, the green lattice, the aforementioned blue corner, and a multi-colored "rainbow road". At the time of the experiment's end on 3 April 2017, over 90,000 users were viewing and editing the canvas, and over one million users had placed a total of approximately 16 million pixels. An analysis found that the final version of the 2017 experiment consisted of art from over 800 communities.

Place was commended for its colorful representation of the Reddit online community. The A.V. Club called it "a benign, colorful way for Redditors to do what they do best: argue among each other about the things that they love". Gizmodo labelled it as a "testament to the internet's ability to collaborate". A number of commentators described the experiment as a broader representation of Internet culture. Some also commented on the apparent relationship between the makeup of the final canvas and the individual communities within Reddit, which exist independently but cooperate as part of a larger community. Newsweek called it "the internet's best experiment yet", and a writer at Ars Technica suggested that the cooperative spirit of Place represented a model for fighting extremism in internet communities. The experiment did receive some criticism for the lack of protection from bot usage and the automated placing of pixels. A website called The r/place Atlas was created after the experiment finished, dedicated to identifying the various components of the final piece.

2022 experiment 
On 28 March 2022, a reboot of Place was announced. It began on 1 April 2022, and lasted for four days, including two expansions of the canvas to allow for more space. The color palette was also expanded on the second and third days. Unlike in 2017, individual subreddits immediately began to coordinate in designing pixel art, and large communities were formed on Discord and Twitch in attempts to expand existing art, replace defaced pixels, and superimpose new images over existing ones. By 3 April, nearly 72 million pixels were placed by over 6 million users, at a pace of more than 2.5 million pixels placed per hour. There was also sixfold increase in the number of users on Reddit between the two experiments, including a 4.5-fold increase in pixels being placed. On the final day, before the 2022 Place event ended, users became restricted to placing only white pixels. The entire canvas was gradually filled with white space, returning it to its original blank state.

References to popular culture, Internet memes and politics were commonly visible. Fandom communities participated by creating illustrations that were representative of their respective subcultures. Similar to 2017, much of the artwork was nationalistic. This included support for Ukraine in the ongoing Russo-Ukrainian War, where Ukrainian president Volodymyr Zelenskyy was depicted with sunglasses.

Popular streamers on Twitch intervened in the event by instructing their viewers to quickly draw logos and symbols, often over existing images. The streamer Félix Lengyel peaked with 233,000 concurrent viewers on his stream because of the event, a personal record. Lengyel's viewers would often get banned by Reddit admins, and Lengyel  said that he had received more death threats in a single hour than he had received in six years of streaming.

Media response 
The first experiment was praised for creating a sense of collectivism at a time when the Internet was to a great extent fractured and polarized. The Washington Post compared Place to The Million Dollar Homepage, a one-million-pixel website where each pixel was sold for a dollar in 2005. The Conversation observed that, while the experiment demonstrated the ability of cooperation in the internet to express people's passions, Place also showed the toxicity and exclusion of some communities. The 2022 edition of the experiment caused Reddit's daily active users to reach an all-time peak. Kotaku welcomed the return of the experiment, saying: "In an era where so much of the modern internet is trash, r/Place has returned and it's still really cool."

See also 
Poietic Generator, a similar collaborative pixel art work created in 1986
The Button (Reddit), an April Fools' Day experiment in 2015

References

External links 
 
 2017 annotated map
 2022 annotated map

place
Reddit
April Fools' Day
Collaborative projects
Computer art
Group processes
Internet culture
Internet properties established in 2017